Stanley Cole Fuchs (July 7, 1952 – December 18, 2000), known professionally as Stan Fox (Fuchs being the German word for "fox"), was an American open wheel race car driver. Fox was one of the last links between the midget car racing world and the Indianapolis 500.

Midget car career
Fox began his career as a midget car racer. He won the 1979 Badger Midget championship, and the 1979 and 1980 Belleville Nationals.  He placed in the top twelve in points in nine seasons, even after he raced sporadically after moving to United States Auto Club (USAC) open wheel events. He had 19 USAC career wins. He won the Turkey Night Grand Prix in 1990 at the last event at Ascot Park. He won the 1991 Turkey Night Grand Prix, two Copper Classics, three Rex Easton Memorials at Springfield, Illinois, two Rodger Mauro Classics, and the midget car portion of the 4-Crown National at Eldora Speedway.

IndyCar career
Fox competed in the Indianapolis 500 eight times between 1987 and 1995 driving for A. J. Foyt and Ron Hemelgarn.  He was also a motorcycle racing enthusiast.

Near-fatal crash at Indianapolis
While driving for Ron Hemelgarn, Fox was seriously injured during the 1995 Indianapolis 500 in a serious accident. After starting ninth, Fox went low into the first turn on the first lap of the race and spun. His car connected with the car of Eddie Cheever, Jr. and slammed into the outside wall. Several other cars also became involved. The front nose-cone was ripped from his car, exposing his legs. Fox suffered serious head injuries which put him in a coma for five days, and had surgery to have a blood clot removed from his brain. After a month, Fox had been moved from the Methodist Hospital critical care unit to a private room, and was showing signs of improvement.

The accident ended Fox's racing career but he stayed involved with the sport. He started the non-profit organization Friends of the Fox which supports people with head injuries and brings a person to the track each May to meet drivers and get VIP treatment.

Death
Fox was driving through the night to attend a speedway meeting and collided head on with a northbound truck and trailer Unit.

Career award
He was inducted in the National Midget Auto Racing Hall of Fame.

Racing record

American open–wheel racing results
(key)

CART

Indianapolis 500

NASCAR
(key) (Bold – Pole position awarded by qualifying time. Italics – Pole position earned by points standings or practice time. * – Most laps led.)

Winston Cup Series

SuperTruck Series

References

External links 
 
  1995 Indy 500 Crash Photos
  1995 Indy 500 Crash Photos
  1995 Indy 500 Crash Photos
  Picture of Stan Fox

1952 births
2000 deaths
Champ Car drivers
Indianapolis 500 drivers
SCCA Formula Super Vee drivers
Indy Lights drivers
Sportspeople from Janesville, Wisconsin
Racing drivers from Wisconsin
Road incident deaths in New Zealand
NASCAR drivers
USAC Silver Crown Series drivers
A. J. Foyt Enterprises drivers